Andrej Trobentar (born 22 November 1951) is a Slovene painter, illustrator and musician.

Trobentar was born in Šent Jurij near Grosuplje in central Slovenia in 1951. He graduated from the Academy of Fine Arts in Ljubljana in 1976 and specialized in painting under Jože Ciuha. He works as a painter, art teacher and illustrator. He was also the vocalist for the rock/funk band Na Lepem Prijazni (NLP) in the late 1970s and 1980s, and since the band reunion in 2005.

He won the Levstik Award in 1986 for his illustrations in the books Waitapu and Pavji rep in druge kitajske basni (Waitapu and The Peacock's Tail and Other Chinese Fables).

References

1951 births
Living people
People from the Municipality of Grosuplje
Slovenian painters
Slovenian male painters
Slovenian illustrators
Yugoslav male singers
Levstik Award laureates
University of Ljubljana alumni
20th-century Slovenian male singers